Northwest Angle 33 First Nation is an Ojibwe or Ontario Anishinaabe First Nation band government who reside in Kenora District, Ontario near Sioux Narrows of Lake of the Woods.

Total registered population in September, 2007, was 438, of which the on-reserve population was 187.  The first Nation is a member of the Anishinabeg of Kabapikotawangag Resource Council, a regional tribal council that is a member of the Grand Council of Treaty 3.

Reserves
The First Nation have reserved for themselves three reserves:
 1335 ha (3299 acres) Northwest Angle Indian Reserve 33B, which serves as their main Reserve, containing the community of Angle Inlet, located across from the Angle Inlet from Angle Inlet, Minnesota.
 1251 ha (3091 acres) Whitefish Bay Indian Reserve 33A, containing the community of Dog Paw, located near Sioux Narrows
 379 ha (937 acres) Agency Indian Reserve 30, which is shared with 12 other First Nations.

Governance
Northwest Angle 33 First Nation is governed by Chief Darlene Ross-Comegan and four Councillors: Diane Sandy, Joseph Katcheconias, Farrell Desrosiers, and Lara Stovern.

References

External links
 profile from INAC

First Nations governments in Ontario
Anishinaabe reserves in Ontario
Saulteaux
Communities in Kenora District